André-Philippe Gagnon (born December 17, 1962) is a Canadian comedian and impressionist.

His impressionist act is unique for his specialized talent in impersonating the singing voices of celebrities, as opposed to his contemporaries, who typically can do only the speaking voices. He is best known for duplicating We Are the World.

He gained widespread recognition in North America after a 1985 appearance on The Tonight Show Starring Johnny Carson and went on to play a regular act at The Venetian in Las Vegas and other venues around the world.

Notable performances
1989 – SkyDome opening ceremony in Toronto, also broadcast live on the TVA Channel.

Discography
1991 L'intégrale [enregistrement sonore] (Distribution Select formerly Distribution Musicor)

References

External links

1962 births
Living people
Musicians from Quebec City
Comedians from Quebec
French Quebecers
Canadian impressionists (entertainers)
Canadian comedy musicians